The Women's biathlon 15 km individual competition of the Lillehammer 1994 Olympics was held at Birkebeineren Ski Stadium on 18 February 1994.

Results

References

Women's biathlon at the 1994 Winter Olympics
Biath
Biat